Tales of the Inexpressible is Shpongle's second album, released in 2001. Simon Posford and Raja Ram hone and expand the style introduced on their debut album, Are You Shpongled?. Raja Ram plays Spanish and East Asian instruments along with the flute, and Simon Posford plays classical guitar as well as synthesizing and sampling.

The song  "Room 23" appears on the back cover of the album with the name "Room 2ॐ", the character "ॐ" being  the Om, the sacred eternal sound in Hinduism. A remastered, super-deluxe edition of Tales of the Inexpressible was released on 26 February 2018.

Track listing

Credits 

 Raja Ram: flute, vocals, illustrations, production
 Simon Posford: programming, guitar, synthesizers, semi-acoustic bass, production
 Michele Adamson: vocals, backing vocals
 Abigail Gorton: vocals
 Harry Escot: cello, acoustic bass
 Pete Callard: acoustic guitar
 Kevin Metcalfe: remastering at The Soundmasters

Samples and allusions
 The name of the song Dorset Perception alludes to Aldous Huxley's book The Doors of Perception. Dorset is the location of Posford's studio, the Hallucinogen Sound Labs.
 The Shpongle song A New Way to Say 'Hooray!''' contains a sample of a lecture by Terence McKenna, in which he references the Pink Floyd song The Gnome (from the 1967 The Piper at the Gates of Dawn album).  The gnomes are actually creatures which Terence describes meeting over and over on many of his DMT related trance experiences.
 A New Way to Say 'Hooray!' contains vocal and choir samples from the sample CD "Heart of Africa Volume 2" by Spectrasonics.
 The sample: "This is, er, no offense but you are a robot, aren't you?" used in Shpongleyes is taken from the classic science fiction movie Forbidden Planet.
The dinosaur sounds sample sounds heard in Shpongleyes are taken from the film Jurassic Park: The Lost World. 
 The male vocals on Around the World in a Tea Daze after 6:45 are a sample from a famous Turkish song titled "Dönülmez Akşamın Ufkundayız" by Turkish Pop singer Tarkan (singer). The lyrics are originally from a poem by Yahya Kemal Beyatlı. The sample is taken from the sample CD "Voices Of Istanbul" by Q Up Arts.
 My Head Feels Like a Frisbee contains merengue horns samples from the sample CD "Festa Latina" by Best Service.
 Towards the end of the track My Head Feels Like a Frisbee, a sample of Ella Fitzgerald singing How High the Moon can be heard. The sample is sped up.
 The end of Star Shpongled Banner'' uses a vocal part of the song "Dança do Vampiro" (Vampire's Dance), by the Brazilian axé music group Asa de Águia.

References

External links 

 Official Shpongle Website

2001 albums
Shpongle albums